The Friedrich-Engelhorn-Hochhaus was a 28-storey,  skyscraper in Ludwigshafen am Rhein, Germany. When completed in 1957 as the headquarters for BASF, it was the tallest building in Germany. Demolition of the building began in late 2013 and was completed in February 2014; new headquarters for BASF will be built on the site.

See also
List of tallest buildings in Germany

References

Office buildings completed in 1957
Former skyscrapers
Buildings and structures demolished in 2014
Buildings and structures in Ludwigshafen
Skyscraper office buildings in Germany